Psilocybe guatapensis is a species of mushroom in the family Hymenogastraceae.  It is very small and is known only from Colombia.

See also
List of Psilocybin mushrooms
Psilocybin mushrooms
Psilocybe

References

External links
Psilocybe guatapensis original species description

Entheogens
Psychoactive fungi
guatapensis
Psychedelic tryptamine carriers
Fungi of North America